B3, B03, B.III or B-3 may refer to:

Military

American bombers
 Keystone B-3, a biplane bomber of the United States Army Air Corps
 Next-Generation Bomber (2018 Bomber), next bomber follow-on to the B-2 stealth bomber program
 Long Range Strike Bomber program, successor program to the 2018 Bomber program
 Northrop Grumman B-21, a successor aircraft to the B-1 and B-52 bombers

German and Austro-Hungarian aircraft
 AEG B.III, a German reconnaissance aircraft
 Albatros B.III, a German Idflieg B-class designation aircraft
 Aviatik B.III, a 1916 Austro-Hungarian reconnaissance aircraft
 Euler B.III, a German Idflieg B-class designation aircraft
 Fokker B.III (disambiguation), two aircraft models
 Halberstadt B.III, a German Idflieg B-class designation aircraft
 Kampfgeschwader 54, from its historic Geschwaderkennung code with the Luftwaffe in World War II
 Lohner B.III
 LVG B.III, a 1910s German two-seat trainer biplane

Submarines
 USS B-3 (SS-12), a United States Navy submarine
 HMS B3, a British B class submarine of the Royal Navy

Civilian transportation

Roads
 B3 road (Kenya)
 B3 road (Namibia)
 Bundesstraße 3, a German national highway

Trains
 Alsace-Lorraine B 3, an Alsace-Lorraine P 1 class steam locomotive
 Bavarian B III, an 1852 German steam locomotive model
 NCC Class B3, an 1890 Irish 4-4-0 passenger steam locomotive
 NSB B3 (Class 3), Norwegian railway carriages
 LNER Class B3, a British locomotive class

Other
 B3 (New York City bus) serving Brooklyn
Bellview Airlines (International Air Transport Association code B3)

Biology and medicine
 B3 (classification), a medical-based Paralympic disability sport classification for blind sport
 B3 domain, a highly conserved plant DNA-binding domain
 Procyanidin B3, a plant phenolic compound
 ATC code B03 Antianemic preparations, a subgroup of the Anatomical Therapeutic Chemical Classification System
 Prodelphinidin B3, a plant phenolic compound
 Vitamin B3 (niacin)

Computing
 A TCSEC security class in the Trusted Computer System Evaluation Criteria
 "B3 Coin" a cryptocurrency

Engines
 A type of four-cylinder Mazda B engine
 Benz B.III, an engine powering the 1914 Friedrichshafen FF.33 German aircraft

Music
 B3 (band), an American boy band most popular in Germany
 B3 (EP), a 2012 EP by alternative rock band Placebo
 Hammond B-3, an electric organ

Other uses
 B3 (stock exchange)
 , the Bochvar logic in calculus
 B03, Alekhine's Defence chess code
 B3: Battle by the Bay, a 1996 Street Fighter tournament
 B3 oil field, an oil and gas field in the Baltic sea
 Model B3 chair, a 1925 German Wassili designer chair
 A subclass of B-class stars in stellar classification
 a permission code for Town and country planning in the United Kingdom
 An ISO 216 international standard that defines paper size
 B3 the chemical formula for triboracyclopropenyl